Stephen Marley may refer to:

Stephen Marley (musician) (born 1972), Jamaican musician; son of Bob Marley
Stephen Marley (writer), British author and video game designer